KGRT-FM (103.9 FM, "KGRT 103.9") is a radio station licensed to serve Las Cruces, New Mexico.  The station is owned by Adams Radio Group, through licensee Adams Radio of Las Cruces, LLC.  It airs a country music format.  Its studios are located in Las Cruces and its transmitter is located off U.S. Highway 70 (Picacho Avenue) near the Rio Grande.

On-air: 
5am-10am: Ernesto Garcia 
10am-3pm: Jackie Wilkinson 
3pm-7pm: Mason 
7pm-midnight: Nash Nights 
Overnight: Blair Garner Show

The station was assigned the KGRT call letters by the Federal Communications Commission on June 15, 1983.

References

External links
KGRT official website

Country radio stations in the United States
GRT-FM